Dianthus myrtinervius, the Albanian pink, is a species of pink native to Albania, Greece, and the former Yugoslavia. Preferring well-drained neutral to alkaline soils, it can be grown in rock gardens, raised beds, or as a border along gravel paths. Petite perennials, they are available from commercial suppliers.

Subspecies

Only one subspecies is presently considered valid. It is quite dwarfed, and forms a cushion.

Dianthus myrtinervius subsp. caespitosus Strid & Papan.

References

myrtinervius
Flora of Europe
Garden plants of Europe
Plants described in 1843